Chishang Township is a rural township in Taitung County, Taiwan.

Chishang was founded by indigenous Makatao from Pingtung 160 years ago, along with the other immigrants, including Taivoan from Kaohsiung and very few Siraya from Tainan later in the 1950s. The indigenous Night Ceremony has been held in Chishang annually in November.

Geography
The township is located at the Huatung Valley.

Administrative divisions
The township comprises 10 villages: Dapo, Dapu, Fuwen, Fuxing, Fuyuan, Jinyuan, Qingfeng, Wanan, Xinxing and Zhenxing.

Tourist attractions

 Chihshang Silkworm Recreation Farm
 Dapo Pond
 Du's Garden
 Hakka Cultural Park
 Mr. Brown Avenue
 Rice Village Museum
 Taitung Veteran's Farm
 Taiwan Sugar Pastoral Farm Resort
 Wu Tao Chishang Lunch Box Cultural History Museum

Transportation

 Chihshang Station

References

External links

 Chihshang Township Office, Taitung County 

Townships in Taitung County